The BOT SC07 Speed Cruiser is a German ultralight and light-sport aircraft, designed  produced by BOT Aircraft of Oerlinghausen and introduced in 2009. The aircraft is supplied as a complete ready-to-fly-aircraft.

Design and development
The SC07 was designed to comply with the Fédération Aéronautique Internationale microlight rules and US light-sport aircraft rules. It is a redesign of the Bilsam Sky Cruiser, featuring a cantilever high-wing, a two-seats-in-side-by-side configuration enclosed cockpit, fixed tricycle landing gear and a single engine in tractor configuration.

The aircraft structure is predominantly made from carbon fibre, with just part of the rudder made from fibreglass. Its  span wing is also made from carbon fibre, covered with fibreglass and fits flaps. Standard engines available are the  Rotax 912ULS and the  D-Motor LF26 four-stroke powerplants.

The SC07 is capable of towing gliders and also operating on floats.

As of January 2017, the design does not appear on the Federal Aviation Administration's list of approved special light-sport aircraft.

Operational history
In January 2017 there were two SC07s registered with the Federal Aviation Administration in the United States, one as Experimental - Exhibition and the other as unknown airworthiness.

Specifications (SC07)

References

External links

2000s German ultralight aircraft
Homebuilt aircraft
Light-sport aircraft
Single-engined tractor aircraft